Chukha District (Dzongkha: ཆུ་ཁ་རྫོང་ཁག་; Wylie: Chu-kha rdzong-khag; also spelled "Chhukha") is one of the 20 dzongkhag (districts) comprising Bhutan.  The major town is Phuentsholing which is the gateway city along the sole road which connects India to western Bhutan (cf. Lateral Road). Chukha is the commercial and the financial capital of Bhutan. With Bhutan's oldest hydropower plant, Chukha hydel (completed in 1986–88), and Tala Hydroelectricity Project, the country's largest power plant, Chukha is the  dzongkhag which contributes the most to the GDP of the country. Also located in Chukha district are some of the country's oldest industrial companies like the Bhutan Carbide Chemical Limited (BCCL) and the Bhutan Boards Products Limited (BBPL).

Languages
In Chukha, the main native languages are Dzongkha, the national language spoken by Ngalop people in the north, and Lhotshampa in the south. The Bhutanese Lhokpu language, spoken by the Lhop minority, is also present in the southwest along the border with Samtse District.

Administrative divisions
Chukha District is divided into eleven village blocks (or gewogs):

Bjacho Gewog
Bongo Gewog
Chapcha Gewog
Dala Gewog
Dungna Gewog
Geling Gewog
Getena Gewog
Logchina Gewog
Metakha Gewog
Phuentsholing Gewog
Sampheling Gewog

Environment
Chukha Dzongkhag covers a total area of 1880 sq. km, but unlike most other districts, Chukha, along with Samtse, contain no protected areas of Bhutan. Although much of southern Bhutan contained protected areas in the 1960s, park-level environmental protection became untenable.

See also
Districts of Bhutan
Dungna
Paro Province
Daga Province

References

External links
Official Dzhongkha profile with a map of gewogs
Five year plan (2002–2007)
Travel diary from Phuentsholing 
Urban problems in Phuentsholing From RAO Online

 
Districts of Bhutan